The 7th Modena Grand Prix was a motor race, run for cars complying with Formula One rules, held on 3 September 1961 at Modena Autodrome, Italy. The race was run over 100 laps of the circuit, and was dominated by British driver Stirling Moss in a Lotus 18/21.

The qualifying system for this event was very unusual in that despite over 30 entrants, the starting grid was restricted to only 14 cars. Furthermore, the fastest three Italian drivers in practice would be guaranteed to start the race, regardless of how many other drivers were faster. This resulted in Innes Ireland failing to qualify despite being 13th fastest, and faster than Giorgio Scarlatti who did qualify.

Moss took pole position, fastest lap and the win, finishing a few seconds ahead of the Porsche pairing of Jo Bonnier and Dan Gurney. Gurney led at the start, but Moss passed him on lap 11 and stayed in front.

Qualifying

Results

Scarlatti and Starrabba used the same car.
Scuderia Centro Sud entered a Cooper-Maserati, given #6, but withdrew the entry.

References

Bibliography
 "The Grand Prix Who's Who", Steve Small, 1995.
 "The Formula One Record Book", John Thompson, 1974.

See also 
 1957 Modena Grand Prix

External links
 

Modena Grand Prix
Modena Grand Prix
Modena Grand Prix